Khatik  is an Indian surname, mostly used in the Khatik caste. The name is derived from the Sanskrit word khattka or kautik meaning butcher or hunter. Notable people with the surname include:

 Amar Singh Khatik, Member of the Legislative Assembly of India
 Banshi Lal Khatik, Member of Legislative Assembly, Rajsamand, Rajasthan
 Harishankar Khatik, Member of Legislative Assembly, Jatara
 Ramesh Prasad Khatik, Member of Legislative Assembly, Karera, Madhya Pradesh
 Shakuntala Khatik, Member of Legislative Assembly
 Uma Devi Khatik, Member of Legislative Assembly, Hatta, Madhya Pradesh
 Virendra Kumar Khatik, Protem Speaker, 7 times, Member of Parliament, Tikamgarh, Madhya Pradesh
Dinesh Khatik, Member of 17th Legislative Assembly, Hastinapur, Uttar Pradesh
Atul Khatik, former MLA, Hastinapur
Munshilal Khatik, State cabinet minister, Madhya Pradesh.
Late Uttamchand Khatik former MLA
Late Shankar Lal Khatik former MP, Sagar
Late Ganeshram Khatik, former MLA, Pathariya
Kamta Prasad Khatik, MLA, Kolaras
Omprakash Khatik, 3 times MLA, Kolaras
Dariyav Khatik, former MLA, Jhajjar

References 

Lists of people by surname